Tiffany Brooks may refer to:
 Tiffany Brooks (baseball) (born 1977), American baseball player
 Tiffany Brooks (designer) (born 1979), American interior designer